USSR National Badminton Championships are officially held since the year 1963. After the end of the Soviet Union, the majority of the former Soviet Republics started own championships like the Azerbaijani National Badminton Championships, Armenian National Badminton Championships, Georgian National Badminton Championships, Moldovan National Badminton Championships and Latvian National Badminton Championships.

Past winners

References
2006

Badminton in the Soviet Union
National badminton championships
Badminton
Recurring sporting events established in 1963
Annual sporting events in the Soviet Union
1963 establishments in the Soviet Union